The Oddfellows Hall is a historic building in the Capitol Hill neighborhood of Seattle, Washington, built in 1908. It is located at East Pine Street and 10th Avenue, near Broadway.

In 2007, it had long served as "a cultural nucleus and point of convergence for community and arts organizations", but its continued status in that capacity was in question. , the only continuing arts organization there was the Century Ballroom.

References

External links

1908 establishments in Washington (state)
Buildings and structures completed in 1908
Buildings and structures in Seattle
Capitol Hill, Seattle
Seattle